Ofir Meir Marciano (or Martziano, ; born 7 October 1989) is an Israeli professional footballer who plays as a goalkeeper for Dutch Eredivisie club Feyenoord, and the Israel national team which he also captains occasionally. He started his career with Israeli side Ashdod and has since played for Belgian club Mouscron and Scottish club Hibernian.

Early and personal life
Marciano was born and raised in Ashdod, Israel, to a family of Sephardic Jewish descent.

He married Israeli model Shelly Regev in 2016. They have two sons.

Club career

Ashdod
Marciano signed for Ashdod in 2008, and made over 130 Israeli Premier League appearances for the Israeli club.

Mouscron 
On 7 July 2015, Marciano signed a season-long loan deal with top division Belgian First Division A club Mouscron.

Hibernian
In August 2016, he signed for Scottish club Hibernian on loan for the 2016–17 season, although regulations held up his eligibility to play for the club. Marciano said that he was sold on the move by fellow Israeli footballer Nir Bitton, who plays for Celtic. Following a three-week delay, it was announced on 26 August 2016 that Marciano had obtained his work permit. He made his debut for the club on the following day, in a 4–0 win against Greenock Morton. Marciano made 21 league appearances as Hibernian won the 2016–17 Scottish Championship, eventually helping his club earn their promotion to the top division of the Scottish Premiership.

In June 2017, he signed a four-year deal with Hibernian. Marciano was replaced in the team by Ross Laidlaw in September, missing one game due to observing Yom Kippur. Marciano regained his place, but in June 2018 he underwent surgery on a finger injury. This caused him to miss matches early in the 2018–19 season, which led to Hibs signing Hungarian goalkeeper Adam Bogdan. Marciano resumed training in October 2018 and subsequently regained the starting position with Hibs.

Chris Maxwell replaced Marciano as first choice early in the 2019–20 season, but the Israeli regained his place during December 2019. Marciano continued as first choice during the 2020–21 season, but advised the club in March 2021 that he would not sign a new contract – eventually finishing that 2020–21 Scottish Premiership season with Hibernian in the 3rd place, as well as making over 120 appearances for the Scottish club.

Feyenoord
Marciano signed a two-year contract with for Dutch top division Eredivisie club Feyenoord in June 2021.

On 19 August 2021, Marciano made his debut playing for Feyenoord during the first leg of a qualifying play-off round match of the UEFA Europa Conference League, that ended in a 5–0 home win against Swedish side Elfsborg for his team. As well as playing in the second leg against Swedish side Elfsborg, that ended in a 3–1 win for Elfsborg. On 25 November 2021, he played for Feyenoord during a group stage match against Czech side Slavia Prague, that ended in a 2–2 away draw. In March and April 2022, Marciano played regularly due to an injury to first choice goalkeeper Justin Bijlow. Marciano helped the team reach the 2022 UEFA Europa Conference League Final, defeating Marseille 3–2 on aggregate in the semi-final. Bijlow recovered from injury in time for the final.

International career 
Marciano made his international debut on 10 October 2014, as Israel won 2–1 against Cyprus, during a UEFA Euro 2016 qualifying away match. Marciano was recalled to the Israel squad in November 2016, but had to withdraw after suffering a knee injury in training. Marciano was recalled to the national squad in March 2019, and played as Israel's on-and-off first choice goalkeeper since the UEFA Euro 2020 qualifiers. He then established his permanent first position for Israel all throughout the 2020–21 UEFA Nations League and the 2022 FIFA World Cup qualification (UEFA).

On 29 March 2020, Marciano was given the captain armband of the senior Israel national team (after first captain Bibras Natcho was substituted out right after the first half), in a home friendly match against Romania that ended in a 2–2 draw.

Career statistics

Club

International

Honours
Hibernian
Scottish Championship: 2016–17

Feyenoord
 UEFA Europa Conference League runner-up: 2021–22

Notes

See also
List of Jewish footballers
List of Jews in sports

References

External links

 
 
 Career stats (VI.nl) - Voetbal International
 
 

1989 births
Living people
Israeli footballers
Jewish footballers
Israeli Jews
Israeli Sephardi Jews
Association football goalkeepers
Israel international footballers
F.C. Ashdod players
Royal Excel Mouscron players
Hibernian F.C. players
Feyenoord players
Israeli Premier League players
Belgian Pro League players
Scottish Professional Football League players
Eredivisie players
Footballers from Ashdod
Israeli people of Portuguese-Jewish descent
Israeli expatriate footballers
Expatriate footballers in Belgium
Expatriate footballers in Scotland
Expatriate footballers in the Netherlands
Israeli expatriate sportspeople in Belgium
Israeli expatriate sportspeople in Scotland
Israeli expatriate sportspeople in the Netherlands
Israeli Mizrahi Jews